John Dawson Hedley Thompson (16 February 1920 – February 2000) was a Scottish-born Welsh international lawn bowler.

Bowls career
Introduced to bowls by his father in 1938 and moved to Wales at the end of World War II. Thompson was a Welsh international from 1961 to 1973 and captain from 1966 to 1968.

Thompson bowled and captained Wales in the 1966 World Outdoor Bowls Championship in New South Wales, Australia.

Thompson won the 1965 fours title and 1982 pairs title at the British Isles Bowls Championships and the Welsh National Bowls Championships when bowling for the Rhiwbina Bowls Club.

Personal life and death
Thompson was a civil servant by trade.

Thompson died in Glamorgan in February 2000, at the age of 80.

References

1920 births
2000 deaths
Welsh male bowls players